Mahakavi Kalidasu is a 1960 Indian Telugu-language biographical film directed by Kamalakara Kameswara Rao and written by Pingali. It stars Akkineni Nageswara Rao and Sriranjani Jr., with music composed by Pendyala. It was produced by K. Nagamani and P. Suri Babu. The film is based on the life of the poet Kalidasa.

Plot 
The king od Avanti kingdom has a daughter Vidyadhari, an ardent devotee of Goddess Mahakali. Once a soothsayer predicts that she would be the leading woman for a great history. Being cognizant of it, the King decides to espouse his daughter with a glorious poet when Mahamantri Hariharamathyudu (K.V.S.Sarma) expresses his desire to couple up the princess with his idiotic son but King scorns him. Enraged Mahamantri ploys and finds a young charming, retarded guy Kaludu (Akkineni Nageswara Rao), passing him off as a great scholar, performs his marriage with the princess. Soon after, Vidyadhari realises the truth, laments before the goddess, to save her, Kaludu makes a huge penance when Kaali accords him a boon of new Knowledge. Immediately, Kaludu transforms into a Sanskrit scholar Kalidasu but forgets the past and leaves the place. Distressed Vidyadhari stands up with courage and keeping faith in her deity goes ahead in search of her husband. Right now, Kalidasu earns various kudos for his works and reaches Kaasi where he clarifies a stanza and states it is from Ramayana written by Lord Hanuman. Listening to it, self-proclaimed poet Rakshasa (C.S.R) at the court of King Bhoja Raja (S.V.Ranga Rao) heckles when Lord Hanuman appears, punishes him and affirms Kalidasa as a great poet. Witnessing it, Bhoja Raja himself moves to pursue whereabouts of him. Both of them meet at a peepal tree where a demon awaiting for there conjoining presents them an idol of Goddess Sharada which they install in Bharatacharya's (P. Suribabu) ashram.

Here, Bhoja Raja bestows a great admiration & respect for Kalidasu which irks Kavi Rakshasa and ruses to defame him. Simultaneously, learning regarding her husband Vidyadhari lands at Kaasi where she spots Kalidasu's closeness with court dancer Vilasavati (Rajasulocahana). Humiliated Vidyadhari tries to commit suicide when Bharatacharya rescues and gives her shelter. Currently, she starts serving Kalidasu who calls her as Uma and falls for her. But recognising her as a married woman he goes into depressed. During that time, as a coincidence, Bhoja Raja asks him scripture an epic on feelings out of separation when Kalidasu composes a beautiful love story Meghasandesam. At that point in time, Kavi Rakshasa challenges to write the same but fails, so, he steals Kalidasu's book. But by god's grace Bhoja Raja understands the reality when Kavi Rakshana is penalised by withdrawing his laureates. Thereafter, Bhoja Raja requests Kalidasu to pen the story of Shakuntala which he hesitates as there is a lack of standards in characters. Later on, with the inspiration of Vidyadhari, he successfully completes another world-class epic Abhijñānaśākuntalam. At present, Bhoja Raja decides to accolade Kalidasu with half of his kingdom. At that juncture, Bharatacharya gazes the relation between Kalidasu & Vidyadhari, so, he invites the King of Avanti too for the event where he professes Kalidasu as his daughter's husband to which he refuses. During that plight, Vidyadhari implores the deity who retrieves Kalidasu's memory. Finally, the movie ends on a happy note with the reunion of the couple.

Cast 
 Akkineni Nageswara Rao as Kalidasa
 Sriranjani Jr. as Vidyadhari
 S. V. Ranga Rao as Raja Bhoja
 C.S.R as Rakshasa Kavi
 Relangi as Sutradhari
 K.V.S.Sarma as Hariharamathyudu
 Vangara
 Mudigonda Lingamurthy as King of Avanti
 P. Suri Babu as Bharathacharya
 Rajasulochana as Vilasavathi, court dancer
 Sandhya
 Vasanthi as Goddess Kalika
 Master Nagaraju

Soundtrack 

Music was composed by Pendyala.

Poems 
Lyrics were written by P. Suribabu

Awards 
National Film Awards
 1960: President's silver medal for Best Feature Film in Telugu

References

External links 
 

1960 films
1960s biographical films
1960s Telugu-language films
Best Telugu Feature Film National Film Award winners
Films about Kalidasa
Films directed by Kamalakara Kameswara Rao
Films scored by Pendyala Nageswara Rao
Indian biographical films
Indian black-and-white films